Posey Township is one of nine townships in Fayette County, Indiana. As of the 2010 census, its population was 508 and it contained 202 housing units.

History
Posey Township was organized in 1823. It was named for Governor Thomas Posey.

The William Lowry House was added to the National Register of Historic Places in 1982.

Geography

Unincorporated towns
 Bentonville
(This list is based on USGS data and may include former settlements.)

Adjacent townships
 Dudley Township, Henry County (north)
 Jackson Township, Wayne County (northeast)
 Washington Township, Wayne County (east)
 Harrison Township (southeast)
 Fairview Township (south)
 Washington Township, Rush County (west)

Cemeteries
The township contains several cemeteries, the largest of which is adjacent to the Bentonville Christian Church.  The remaining cemeteries are predominantly small family plots dating back to the 1800s.

References
 United States Census Bureau cartographic boundary files
 U.S. Board on Geographic Names

External links
 Indiana Township Association
 United Township Association of Indiana

Townships in Fayette County, Indiana
Townships in Indiana